

Cuthfrith (died  769) was a medieval Bishop of Lichfield.

Cuthfrith was consecrated in 765 and died about 769.

Notes

Citations

References

External links
 

8th-century English bishops
Anglo-Saxon bishops of Lichfield
769 deaths
Year of birth unknown